Robert Rainie (25 September 1860 – c. October 1945) was a Scottish rugby union player. He later became an international referee and was the 24th President of the Scottish Rugby Union.

Rugby Union career

Amateur career

Rainie played for Edinburgh Wanderers.

Referee career

He refereed the England versus Wales match in the 1890 Home Nations Championship and the Wales versus England match in the 1891 Home Nations Championship. and the Ireland versus Wales match in the 1894 Home Nations Championship.

Administrative career

Rainie became the 24th President of the Scottish Rugby Union. He served the 1897–98 term in office.

Outside of rugby

Rainie was a Chartered Accountant. He was a partner in the firm Brewis, Rainie and Boyd.

He was an auditor of Mortonhall Golf Club.

His brother was the Rev. William Rainie, a minister of Newton-on-Ayr parish for 47 years.

Robert Rainie died circa October 1945. The Executory Notice of his estate was advertised in The Scotsman on 6 October 1945.

References

1860 births
1945 deaths
People educated at Merchiston Castle School
Scottish rugby union players
Presidents of the Scottish Rugby Union
Scottish rugby union referees
Edinburgh Wanderers RFC players
Rugby union players from Edinburgh